Mount Hermon ( / ALA-LC: Jabal al-Shaykh ("Mountain of the Sheikh") or Jabal Haramun; , Har Hermon)  is a mountain cluster constituting the southern end of the Anti-Lebanon mountain range. On the top, in the United Nations buffer zone between Syrian and Israeli-occupied territories, is the highest permanently manned UN position in the world, known as "Hermon Hotel", located at 2814 metres altitude. The southern slopes of Mount Hermon extend to the Israeli-occupied portion of the Golan Heights, where the Mount Hermon ski resort is located with a top elevation of 2,040 metres (6,690 ft). A peak in this area rising to 2,236 m (7,336 ft) is the highest elevation in Israeli-controlled territory.

Geography

Wider mountain range

Hermon range
The relatively narrow Hermon range, with the Lebanon-Syria boundary along its spine, extends for 70 km, from 25 km northeast of Mt. Hermon to 45 km southwest of it. Mount Hermon is a cluster of mountains with three distinct summits, each about the same height. Most of the portion of Mount Hermon within the Israeli-controlled area constitutes the Hermon nature reserve.

Water and flora
The mountain forms one of the greatest geographic resources of the area. Because of its height it captures a great deal of precipitation in a very dry area of the world. The Jurassic limestone is broken by faults and solution channels to form a karst topography. Mount Hermon has seasonal winter and spring snow falls, which cover all three of its peaks for most of the year. Melt water from the snow-covered mountain's western and southern bases seeps into the rock channels and pores, feeding springs at the base of the mountain, which form streams and rivers. These merge to become the Jordan River. Additionally, the runoff facilitates fertile plant life below the snow line, where vineyards and pine, oak, and poplar trees are abundant.

Strategic importance
The springs, and the mountain itself, are much contested by the nations of the area for the use of the water. Mount Hermon is also called the "snowy mountain," the "gray-haired mountain", and the "mountain of snow". It is also called "the eyes of the nation" in Israel because its elevation makes it Israel's primary strategic early warning system.

Religious importance since Antiquity
See also Temples of Mount Hermon
Various temples can be found in villages on the slopes of Mount Hermon.

Mount Hermon's name has been related to the Semitic root ḥrm, which means "taboo" or "consecrated", and the Arabic term al-ḥaram, which means "sacred enclosure".

Epic of Gilgamesh
The Epic of Gilgamesh mentions that Mount Hermon split after Gilgamesh killed Humbaba, the Guardian of the Cedar Forest. One translation of Tablet V states, "The ground split open with the heels of their feet, as they whirled around in circles Mt. Hermon and Lebanon split."

Ugaritic religion
The mountain or summit is referred to as Saphon in Ugaritic texts where the palace of Ba'al is located in a myth about Attar.

Hebrew Bible and apocrypha

The Hebrew Bible uses three names for Mount Hermon, stating in Deut 3:9 that "the Sidonians call Hermon Sirion, while the Amorites call it Senir", but elsewhere seems to distinguish between Senir and Hermon, probably using the names for two of the three peaks of the Hermon range, while in  the Hebrew text uses the plural form, Hermonim, possibly also a reference to the three peaks.

The Book of Chronicles mentions Mount Hermon as a place where Epher, Ishi, Eliel, Azriel, Jeremiah, Hodaviah, and Jahdiel were the heads of their families.

In Psalm 42, which leads the Psalms of the northern kingdom, the Psalmist remembers God from the land of Jordan and the Hermonites. In Song of Songs 4:8, Hermon is an instance of an exotic locale, and Psalm 133, one of the Songs of Ascents, makes specific reference to the abundant dew formation upon Mount Hermon. The Book of Ezekiel (27:5), meanwhile, praises its cypresses (referring to it by its alternate name Senir (cf. Deut. 3:9).

In the apocryphal Book of Enoch, Mount Hermon is the place where the Watcher class of fallen angels descended to Earth. They swear upon the mountain that they would take wives among the daughters of men and take mutual imprecation for their sin (Enoch 6).

According to the controversial research by Professor Israel Knohl of the Hebrew University, in his book "Hashem", Mount Hermon is actually the Mount Sinai mentioned in the Hebrew Bible, with the biblical story reminiscent of an ancient battle of the northern tribes with the Egyptians somewhere in the Jordan valley or Golan heights.

New Testament
R.T. France, in his book on the Gospel of Matthew, noted that Mount Hermon was a possible location of the Transfiguration of Jesus,  just
as it has elsewhere been described as the site accepted by most scholars.

Qasr Antar inscription and Hermon as the "mountain of oath"
There is a sacred building made of hewn blocks of stone on the summit of Mount Hermon. Known as Qasr Antar, it is the highest temple of the ancient world and was documented by Sir Charles Warren in 1869. An inscription on a limestone stele recovered by Warren from Qasr Antar was translated by George Nickelsburg to read "According to the command of the greatest a(nd) Holy God, those who take an oath (proceed) from here." Nickelsburg connected the inscription with the oath taken by the angels under Semjaza who took an oath together, bound by a curse, in order to take human wives in the Book of Enoch. Hermon was said to have become known as "the mountain of oath" by Charles Simon Clermont-Ganneau. The name of God was supposed to be a Hellenized version of Baʿal or Hadad and Nickelsburg connected it with the place name of Baal-Hermon (Lord of Hermon) and the deity given by Enoch as "The Great Holy One".

Deir El Aachayer Roman temple
Another Greek inscription found in a large temple at Deir El Aachayer on the northern slopes notes the year that a bench was installed "in the year 242, under Beeliabos, also called Diototos, son of Abedanos, high priest of the gods of Kiboreia". The era of the gods of Kiboreia is not certain, nor is their location, which is not conclusively to be identified with Deir al-Achayer, but was possibly the Roman sanctuary or the name of a settlement in the area.

Religious importance in the Late Roman period
Eusebius recognized the religious importance of Hermon in his work Onomasticon (probably written in the first quarter of the 4th century), saying "Until today, the mount in front of Banias and Lebanon is known as Hermon and it is respected by nations as a sanctuary".

Climate
According to the Köppen climate classification, the weather station at Mount Hermon features a warm-summer Mediterranean climate (Csb). The climate might also more specifically be described as oro-Mediterranean (CsbH). Its temperature range is relatively narrow, while its yearly variation in precipitation is very wide; with mild, rainless summers, and chilly, very wet and often snowy winters.

Arab-Israeli conflict

1967 Six-Day War
During the Six-Day War in June 1967, a part of Mount Hermon in Syria was captured by Israel.

1973 Yom Kippur War
This part was regained by Syria on October 6, 1973, the first day of the Yom Kippur War, following the First Battle of Mount Hermon. After being repelled in the Second Battle of Mount Hermon, the IDF recaptured both the formerly Israeli-occupied sector and the pre-Yom Kippur War Syrian-controlled sector on October 21, 1973, during Operation Dessert, also known as the Third battle of Mount Hermon.

After 1973
The pre-Yom Kippur War Syrian-controlled sector was returned to Syria after the war.

The Israeli-occupied sector of the mountain became patrolled by the Israel Defense Forces and the Israel Police, and the Israeli Security Forces have maintained a strategic observation post for monitoring Syrian and Lebanese military activity near Mitzpe Shlagim ("Snow Lookout"), which is at an elevation of about 2,224 m (7,300 ft).

Syrian Civil War
Since the onset of Syrian Civil War, the Syrian-controlled Hermon has continued to be under pro-government forces, though clashes have sporadically erupted on the mountain range and spilled into Lebanon and the Israeli-occupied portion. Most notably the Islamist rebel factions of Jaish al-Haramoun took part in the fighting on the Southern slopes of the mountain.

Ski resort

Since 1981, when the Golan Heights Law was passed, the Israeli-occupied portion of the Golan Heights has been governed under Israeli law. Mount Hermon hosts the only ski resort in territory held by Israel, including a wide range of ski trails at novice, intermediate, and expert levels. It also offers additional winter family activities such as sledding and Nordic skiing. Those who operate the Hermon Ski area live in the nearby Israeli settlement of Neve Ativ and the Druze town of Majdal Shams. The ski resort has a ski school, ski patrol, and several restaurants located at either the bottom or peak of the area.

In 2005, the Syrian government had plans to develop a 15-billion-dollar ski resort on the slopes of the mountain.

See also
 Hermon nature reserve
 Mountains in the Golan Heights
 List of elevation extremes by country
 Iris hermona

Notes

References

External links

 
Mountains of the Golan Heights
International mountains of Asia
Mountains of Israeli-occupied territories
Mountains of Lebanon
Mountains of Syria
Two-thousanders of Asia
Mount Hermon
Mount Hermon
Hebrew Bible mountains
Mount Hermon
Mount Hermon
Highest points of countries